The Workers' Fraternity Party (İKP) is a democratic socialist political party in Turkey.

The Workers' Fraternity Party was founded in June 2006 and renamed itself as "United Workers' Party of Turkey" (TBİP) in March 2010. In October 2010, the chairman of the TBİP Zeki Kılıçaslan resigned for found People's Voice Party with Islamists politicians. After that, Mehmet Şadi Ozansü was elected as chairman and the United Workers' Party of Turkey changed its name to "Workers' Fraternity Party" again.

References

External links

2006 establishments in Turkey
Communist parties in Turkey
Eurosceptic parties in Turkey
Far-left politics in Turkey
Political parties established in 2006
Trotskyist organizations in Turkey